The Christopher Little Literary Agency is a firm of literary agents based in London. Its clients have included Darren Shan, A. J. Quinnell, Pip Vaughan Hughes, Philip Kazan, Pippa Mattinson, Cathy Hopkins, Robert Mawson, Robert Radcliffe, General Sir Mike Jackson, Wladyslaw Szpilman and Janet Gleeson. Christopher Little, who ran the agency, also managed Harry Potter author J. K. Rowling from 1995 until 2011 and has been credited with single-handedly managing Rowling's career and turning the Harry Potter franchise into a multi-million pound industry. He has been described as "the luckiest agent ever" who was half of "the most commercially successful relationship in literary history".

History

Christopher Little
Christopher John Little was born in York in 1941, and grew up in Liversedge. He began a recruitment agency in the 1970s, when looking for work in the United Kingdom after returning from a financial career abroad. He sold his first novel in 1979: the book Man on Fire, written by his friend, Phillip Nicholson, and published under the pseudonym A. J. Quinnell. Little then established the Christopher Little Literary Agency. Though he considered it only a hobby at first, the recruitment firm grew, and represented 20 authors by the time he sold it in 1992.

Little died from cancer on 7 January 2021, at age 79.

J. K. Rowling
In 1995, Little received three chapters of a manuscript from J. K. Rowling who was looking for representation. Looking at a list of literary agents she saw the name "Christopher Little" and, believing it to sound like a character in a children's story, sent him the first three chapters of Harry Potter and the Philosopher's Stone. Little responded four days later requesting the balance of the book, thinking there was something special about it. Every major UK publisher turned the book down but a small publishing company had just opened a children’s department Bloomsbury Publishing. They too saw the potential and bought UK Commonwealth publication rights in 1996 for one book for £2,500, a small figure but he believed it to be his "masterstroke". The US rights for one book in the United States subsequently went to auction after word of mouth and positive reviews raised significant interest in the property which went for a six figure sum. Foreign language publication rights were subsequently sold in over 80 languages. In 2007 he was estimated to have received at least £50m from the franchise. Little has been called "the luckiest agent ever" and is credited with turning Rowling into a "literary superstar". The pair have been described as being "the most commercially successful relationship in literary history".

Little's association with Rowling did not end well with the author choosing to leave Little. She left to join one of Little's former business partners, Neil Blair, as he set up his own agency. This led to Little considering legal action against the author but the dispute was settled amicably. The details of the settlement remain confidential.

Other authors
The Christopher Little Literary Agency has represented numerous authors, mainly in commercial fiction, including Darren Shan, Anne Zouroudi, Erin Kinsley, and Janet Gleeson. It has also represented people with their autobiographies, including Madeleine by Kate McCann and Soldier by General Sir Mike Jackson. Films included The Pianist, The Vampire’s Assistant and the Harry Potter series.

References

External links
Corporate website

British literary agencies
Organisations based in London